Bessemer is an unincorporated community in Athens County, in the U.S. state of Ohio.

History
A post office called Bessemer was established in 1877, and remained in operation until 1879. Bessemer was historically a mining community.

References

Unincorporated communities in Athens County, Ohio
1877 establishments in Ohio
Populated places established in 1877
Unincorporated communities in Ohio